Pari Zangeneh (born 1939, Kashan, Iran) is an Iranian opera and folk singer (Spinto soprano). She was taught by Evelyn Baghtcheban. She lost her eyesight in a car accident.

References

External links

 Pari Zangeneh on last.fm

1939 births
Living people
20th-century Iranian women singers
20th-century women opera singers
Iranian sopranos
Iranian opera singers
People from Kashan
Blind musicians
Iranian blind people